Albert Hofman may refer to:
 Albert Hofman (epidemiologist), Dutch clinical epidemiologist
 Albert Hofman (footballer), Romanian footballer

See also
Albert Hofmann (1906–2008), Swiss scientist and discoverer of LSD-25
 Albert Hoffman (disambiguation)